José Ignacio 'Nacho' Franco Zumeta (born 1 August 1981) is a Spanish retired footballer who played as a forward.

Football career
Franco was born in Pina de Ebro, Province of Zaragoza. He spent the vast majority of his career playing in the third and fourth divisions of Spanish football, representing more than ten clubs.

Franco had his first and only La Liga experience in the 2003–04 season, which consisted of two matches (13 minutes) for Celta de Vigo in a relegation-ending campaign. During his two-year spell with the Galicians – which brought him a further two appearances in the second level – he was mostly registered with their reserves.

External links
 

1981 births
Living people
Sportspeople from the Province of Zaragoza
Spanish footballers
Footballers from Aragon
Association football forwards
La Liga players
Segunda División players
Segunda División B players
Tercera División players
SD Huesca footballers
Real Zaragoza B players
Celta de Vigo B players
RC Celta de Vigo players
Universidad de Las Palmas CF footballers
UE Lleida players
Logroñés CF footballers
Coruxo FC players